The Kennet and Avon Canal is a canal in southern England. The name may refer to either the route of the original Kennet and Avon Canal Company, which linked the River Kennet at Newbury to the River Avon at Bath, or to the entire navigation between the River Thames at Reading and the Floating Harbour at Bristol, including the earlier improved river navigations of the River Kennet between Reading and Newbury and the River Avon between Bath and Bristol.

The River Kennet was made navigable to Newbury in 1723, and the River Avon to Bath in 1727. The Kennet and Avon Canal between Newbury and Bath was built between 1794 and 1810 by John Rennie, to convey commercial barges carrying a variety of cargoes, and is 57 miles (92 km) long. The two river navigations and the canal total 87 miles (140 km) in length. The section from Bristol to Bath is the course of the River Avon, which flows through a wide valley and has been made navigable by a series of locks and weirs. In the later 19th century and early 20th century the canal fell into disuse following competition from the Great Western Railway, who owned the canal. Between 1970 and 1990 the canal was restored, largely by volunteers, and today is a popular heritage tourism destination, for boating, canoeing, fishing, walking and cycling. It is also important for wildlife conservation.

There are 105 locks on the Kennet and Avon Canal from Bristol to the River Thames, including six on the navigable section of the River Avon from Bristol to Bath and nine on the navigable section of the River Kennet to its confluence with the Thames near Reading. The remaining 90 locks lie along the 57 miles (92 km) of canal. In Bath the canal separates from the river but follows its valley as far as Bradford on Avon. The ornate Bath Locks lead to a stretch through Limpley Stoke valley with few locks. The flight of locks at Devizes, including the Caen Hill Locks, raises the canal to its longest pound, which then ascends the four Wootton Rivers locks to the short summit pound which includes the Bruce Tunnel. Pumping stations are used to supply the canal with water. The canal continues through the rural landscape of Wiltshire and Berkshire before joining the River Kennet at Newbury and becoming a navigable river to Reading, where it flows into the River Thames.

Locks

The following list numbers the locks from the River Avon in Bristol to the River Thames. It includes one lock that has been removed (98, Ufton Lock) and two that have been combined to form a single deep lock (8 and 9, now Bath Deep Lock). Travelling from Bristol to Reading, locks 1 to 54 are uphill, and locks 55 to 107 are downhill.

Notes
Hanham Lock, Keynsham Lock, Swineford Lock, Saltford Lock, Kelston Lock and Weston Lock are technically on the Avon Navigation rather than being truly part of the Kennet and Avon Canal
 Locks below Newbury and above High Bridge in Reading are technically on the Kennet Navigation rather than being truly part of the Kennet and Avon Canal
Grid reference is based on the British national grid reference system, also known as OSGB36, and is the system used by the Ordnance Survey.
Lock numbers are as given in the Pearsons Guide and as numbered on the lock paddles.
Sheffield Lock is also a scheduled monument.
Listed building status is given to buildings (including locks) in the United Kingdom which are designated by English Heritage on behalf of the government, as being of special architectural, historical or cultural significance. There are three types of listed status (in descending order of importance and difficulty to obtain planning permission; Grade I: buildings of exceptional interest, Grade II*: particularly important buildings of special interest, Grade II: buildings of special interest.
 Ufton Lock is still extant, but the gates have been removed so that boats go straight through. The next lock above, Towney Lock, was deepened when rebuilt to allow for the lower downstream water level.
 Blake's Lock is on the part of the River Kennet, below High Bridge in Reading, that has been navigable since at least the medieval period and now administered by the Environment Agency as part of the River Thames navigation.

See also

Canals of the United Kingdom
History of the British canal system

References

External links
Photos of the Kennet and Avon Canal on www.tonycanalpics.co.uk

Locks on the Kennet and Avon Canal
Kennet and Avon Canal
Canals in Wiltshire
Buildings and structures in Wiltshire